The Severn River is in the South Island of New Zealand.  The headwaters of the river are in the Raglan Range and it flows into the Acheron River.  One of its tributaries is the Alma River.

Rivers of the Marlborough Region
Rivers of New Zealand

References